The Autolite 4300 was a Ford (also used by AMC) carburetor manufactured from 1967 through 1974. These carburetors were produced as an emissions-compliant replacement for the previous Autolite 4100 model, and were later superseded by the Motorcraft 4350.

Both the 4300A and 4300D are unique by virtue of having spread bore throttle plate designs (the 4300A being much less pronounced than the 4300D) that are unique to these carburetors and their relative intake manifolds.

Variations

4300A, 441 CFM (1967-1969)
The first version of this carburetor was released in 1967, replacing the 4100 on all Fords excluding the police package 428 CID and 289 CID high-output engines.

4300A 441 CFM specs:
 1" primary venturi
 Primary throttle bore: 1-7/16"
 Secondary throttle bore: 1-9/16"

The 441 CFM carburetor was found to run too lean for the 390 CID engines; hence, the 600 CFM 4300A was developed the following year for these larger applications. The 441 CFM 4300A was discontinued after the 1969 model year in favor of the two-barrel Autolite 2100 carburetor.

4300A, 600 CFM (1968-1974)
Due to the limited flow of the 441 CFM version of the 4300A, a 600 CFM version of the same was released in 1968. By 1970, it was factory supplied on most Fords equipped with the 429 and 460, in addition to vehicles with the 351 Cleveland.

4300A 600 CFM specs:
 1.25" primary venturi
 Primary throttle bore: 1-9/16"
 Secondary throttle bore: 1-11/16"

4300D, 715 CFM spreadbore (1971-1974)
In 1971, a much more pronounced spreadbore design was released, dubbed the 4300D. They are incompatible with other spreadbore intake designs.

4300D 715 CFM specs:
 1.25" primary venturi
 Primary throttle bore: 1-9/16"
 Secondary throttle bore: 2"

Motorcraft 4350

The 4300D was replaced by the Motorcraft 4350 carburetor in 1975.

Criticism and improvements
Both variants of the 4300 have been criticized for poor acceleration, rough operation, and a potential for fire due to a poor fuel inlet design. This negative reputation is not universally accepted amongst users of these carburetors.

See also
Ford 335 engine
Ford 385 engine
List of Ford engines

References

Carburettors
Ford Motor Company